Aiza Maizo-Pontillas (born February 29, 1988) is a Filipina professional volleyball player. She was a former member and team captain of the UST Golden Tigresses, and a member of the Philippines women's national volleyball team.  She led the España-based squad to its 16th and, as of 2018, latest championship in the University Athletic Association of the Philippines (UAAP) league. She was a Shakey's V-League (SVL) three-time Finals and two-time Season Most Valuable Player. Maizo is known for bagging several best-of awards in almost all volleyball skill departments in UAAP and SVL, excluding setting and digging. She is also known as the first Filipina in the entire franchise of SVL to take both Finals and Season MVP in a single conference twice.

Education
Maizo graduated from the University of Santo Tomas with a Bachelor of Science in Food Technology.

Volleyball career

Collegiate career
Maizo started her collegiate volleyball career as a back-up setter of the UST Golden Tigresses in UAAP Season 68. In Season 69, she transitioned into an Opposite Hitter by Coach August Sta. Maria of UST. UST gets its 14th championship title, her first championship as a player in UAAP. She came back in Season 71 as team captain and led UST into 3rd place and won the Best Attacker award. In Season 72, Maizo and the rest of UST Golden Tigresses defeated De La Salle University and hailed as UAAP Champions, her second championship title in UAAP. Maizo received Best Scorer and Best Receiver awards led UST into finals appearance but ended her collegiate career as runner-up losing to arch-rival De La Salle University in UAAP Season 73.

Maizo was part of the 5 championship titles of UST in Shakey's V-League. She and the UST Golden Tigresses hailed as back to back champions in V-League 4th Season, 1st and 2nd Conference against arch-rivals, San Sebastian College-Recoletos. In V-League 5th Season, 2nd Conference, UST loss to SSC-R in finals, Maizo bagged the Best Server of the season.

She also led the UST Golden Tigresses in back to back to back championships. In V-League 6th Season, 1st Conference, UST won the championship against San Sebastian College-Recoletos and she won the Best Blocker award. UST won the V-League 6th Season, 2nd Conference against Adamson University and she was the first and only player awarded both Conference MVP and Finals MVP. Maizo led the UST into championship in V-League 7th Season, 1st Conference and won the Best Attacker and Finals MVP awards.

Semi professional career
In the Shakey's V-League 12th Season Open Conference, Maizo-Pontillas helped Cagayan Valley Lady Rising Suns to reach the third place of the tournament. She later won the Shakey's V-League 12th Season Reinforced Open Conference with PLDT Home Ultera Fast Hitters. She was sidelined from the national team set to compete in the 2015 Southeast Asian Games, but she was later hired as assistant coach for the games. 
She played the 2016 Philippine Superliga Invitational Cup with Petron Tri-Activ Spikers having won the second place of the tournament and the Best Opposite Spiker individual award.

With Petron Blaze Spikers, Maizo-Pontillas won the 2017 PSL Grand Prix Conference silver medal. The following year, she together with Stalzer, Katherine Bell and Rhea Dimaculangan led Petron to the 2018 PSL Grand Prix Conference championship.

Clubs
  UST Golden Tigresses (2007–2011)
  Cagayan Valley Lady Rising Suns (2010-2015)
  PLDT Home Ultera Fast Hitters (2015)
  Petron Tri-Activ Spikers (2013, 2016–2020)
  Sta. Lucia Lady Realtors (2021)
  Petro Gazz Angels (2022-)

Awards

Individuals
 2008 Shakey's V-League 2nd Conference "Best Server"
 UAAP Season 71 "Best Scorer"
 UAAP Season 71 "Best Attacker"
 2009 Shakey's V-League 1st Conference  "Best Blocker"
 2009 Shakey's V-League 2nd Conference  "Final's Most Valuable Player"
 2009 Shakey's V-League 2nd Conference  "Season's Most Valuable Player"
 2010 Shakey's V-League 1st Conference "Final's Most Valuable Player"
 2010 Shakey's V-League 1st Conference "Best Attacker"
 UAAP Season 73 "Best Scorer"
 UAAP Season 73 "Best Receiver"
 2014 Shakey's V-League Reinforced Open Conference "Finals Most Valuable Player"
 2014 Shakey's V-League Reinforced Open Conference "Conference Most Valuable Player"
 2014 Shakey's V-League Reinforced Open Conference "Best Scorer"
 2016 Philippine Superliga Invitational Cup "Best Opposite Spiker"
 2016 Philippine Superliga Grand Prix "2nd Best Opposite Spiker"
 2017 PSL All-Filipino "Most Valuable Player"
 2018 Philippine Superliga Invitational Cup "Best Opposite Spiker"
 2018 Philippine SuperLiga All-Filipino Conference "Best Opposite Spiker"
2019 Philippine Superliga Invitational Conference "Best Opposite Spiker"

Club
 UAAP Season 69 -  Champion, with UST Golden Tigresses
 2008 Shakey's V-League 2nd Conference -  1st Runner-Up, with UST Golden Tigresses
 UAAP Season 71 -  2nd Runner-Up, with UST Golden Tigresses
 2009 Shakey's V-League 1st Conference -  Champion, with UST Golden Tigresses
  2009 Shakey's V-League 2nd Conference -  Champion, with UST Golden Tigresses
 2009 University Games -  Champion, with UST Golden Tigresses 
 UAAP Season 72 -  Champion, with UST Golden Tigresses
 2010 Shakey's V-League 1st Conference -  Champion, with UST Golden Tigresses
 UAAP Season 73 -  1st Runner-Up, with UST Golden Tigresses
 2012 Shakey's V-League Open Conference -  1st Runner-Up, with Cagayan Valley Lady Rising Suns
 2013 Shakey's V-League Open Conference -  Champion, with Cagayan Valley Lady Rising Suns
 2013 POC-PSC Philippine National Games -  1st Runner-Up, with Cagayan Volley Bomberinas
 2013 Cagayan Friendship Games -  Champion, with Cagayan Valley Lady Rising Suns
 2014 Shakey's V-League Open Conference -  1st Runner-up, with Cagayan Valley Lady Rising Suns
 2014 Shakey's V-League Reinforced Open Conference -  Champion, with Cagayan Valley Lady Rising Suns
 2014 POC-PSC Philippine National Games -  2nd Runner-Up, with Cagayan Volley Bomberinas
 2014 Cagayan Friendship Games -  Champion, with Cagayan Valley Lady Rising Suns
 2015 Shakey's V-League Open Conference -  2nd-Runner Up, with Cagayan Valley Lady Rising Suns
 2015 Cagayan Friendship Games -  2nd Runner-up, with Cagayan Valley Lady Rising Suns
 2015 Shakey's V-League Reinforced Open Conference -  Champion, with PLDT Home Ultera Fast Hitters
 2016 Philippine SuperLiga Invitational Cup -  1st Runner-up, with Petron Tri-Activ Spikers
 2016 Philippine SuperLiga Grand Prix Conference -  1st Runner-up, with Petron Tri-Activ Spikers
 2017 Philippine Super Liga Invitational Cup -  1st Runner-up, with Petron Tri-Activ Spikers
 2017 Philippine SuperLiga All-Filipino Conference -  Champion, with Petron Blaze Spikers
 2017 Philippine SuperLiga Grand Prix Conference -  1st Runner-up, with Petron Blaze Spikers
 2018 Philippine SuperLiga Grand Prix Conference -  Champion, with Petron Blaze Spikers
 2018 Philippine SuperLiga All-Filipino Conference -  Champion, with Petron Blaze Spikers
 2022 PVL Open Conference -  Runner-up, with Petro Gazz Angels
 2022 PVL Reinforced Conference -  Champion, with Petro Gazz Angels

References

Living people
University of Santo Tomas alumni
University Athletic Association of the Philippines volleyball players
1988 births
Opposite hitters
Philippines women's international volleyball players
Filipino women's volleyball players
Sportspeople from Iloilo
Competitors at the 2017 Southeast Asian Games
Southeast Asian Games competitors for the Philippines